Stephen M. Sheppard (born 1963) is an American professor of law, legal historian, and editor. He is Dean Emeritus, and Charles E. Cantú Distinguished Professor of Law Emeritus at St. Mary's University School of Law, in San Antonio, Texas.

Education 

Sheppard received a B.A. in Political Science from the University of Southern Mississippi followed by a J.D., L.L.M., and his doctorate, J.S.D., from Columbia University.  He has also received a post-J.D. certificate in International Law from Columbia University and was made Master of Letters by Oxford University.

Scholarship

Sheppard is a legal historian, with a focus on the development of the common law and of legal institutions, particularly legal education in the United States.  His work in the law has been cited by courts including the Utah Supreme Court, (in State v. Reyes, 116 P.3d 305 (2005)) which changed the burden of proof for felonies in Utah citing Sheppard's law review article, "The Metamorphoses of Reasonable Doubt: How Changes in the Burden of Proof Have Weakened the Presumption of Innocence". Dr. Sheppard is credited as the General Editor of a revised edition of the American legal dictionary by John Bouvier, The Wolters Kluwer Bouvier Law Dictionary. As an editor, he has prepared new editions of several law books, including the Opera Omnia of John Selden, Bramble Bush by Karl Llewellyn, and Introduction to the Legal System of the United States by E. Allan Farnsworth.

Professional career
A member of the State Bar of Texas and the Mississippi Bar, Sheppard is admitted to practice before the U.S. Supreme Court and the U.S. Tax Court.

Until 2014, he was the William H. Enfield Distinguished Professor of Law at the University of Arkansas School of Law, where he was also the Associate Dean for Research and Faculty Development.

Awards 

 Member of the American Law Institute
 Member of the Royal Historical Society

Publications 

  The Selected Writings and Speeches of Sir Edward Coke, Liberty Fund, 2003, 
 with George P. Fletcher,  American Law in a Global Context: The Basics Oxford University Press, 2005, 
 The History of Legal Education in the United States: Commentaries and Primary Sources Salem Press, 2005, 
 I Do Solemnly Swear: The Moral Obligations of Legal Officials Cambridge University Press, 2009, 
 General Editor,  The Wolters Kluwer Bouvier Law Dictionary: Compact Edition, Kluwer, 2011, 
 An Introduction to the Legal System of the United States, Fourth Edition, Oxford University Press, 2010,

References

1963 births
Living people
St. Mary's University, Texas faculty
University of Southern Mississippi alumni
Columbia Law School alumni
University of Arkansas School of Law faculty
21st-century American historians
21st-century American male writers
Legal historians
Deans of law schools in the United States
American male non-fiction writers